Nessovbaatar is a genus of extinct mammal from the Upper Cretaceous of Mongolia. It eked out its living in the company of Central Asian dinosaurs. This animal was a member of the extinct order Multituberculata within the suborder Cimolodonta and family Sloanbaataridae.

The genus Nessovbaatar ("Nesov's hero") was named by Kielan-Jaworowska Z. and Hurum J.H. in 1997 in honour of Russian paleontologist Dr. Nesov. The only known species is Nessovbaatar multicostatus (Kielan-Jaworowska & Hurum 1997), fossils of which were found in the Upper Cretaceous Barun Goyot Formation of Mongolia.

References 
 Kielan-Jaworowska Z & Hurum JH (1997), "Djadochtatheria: a new suborder of multituberculate mammals". Acta Palaeontologica Polonica 42(2), p 201-242.
 Kielan-Jaworowska Z & Hurum JH (2001), "Phylogeny and Systematics of multituberculate mammals". Paleontology 44, p. 389-429.
 Much of this information has been derived from  MESOZOIC MAMMALS; Djadochtatherioidea, an Internet directory.

Cimolodonts
Santonian life
Campanian life
Late Cretaceous mammals of Asia
Fossils of Mongolia
Fossil taxa described in 1997
Prehistoric mammal genera